Pseudochromis linda, the yellowtail dottyback, is a species of ray-finned fish from the western Indian Ocean, which is a member of the family Pseudochromidae.

References

linda
Taxa named by John Ernest Randall
Taxa named by Brock E. Stanaland
Fish described in 1989